Socialist Youth Front (Danish: Socialistisk UngdomsFront, abbreviated SUF) is a socialist political youth organisation  in Denmark, consisting of 1,500 members distributed between 35 autonomous local groups.

It was established in 2001 on the initiative of the youth group Rebel and the youth network of the Red-Green Alliance (Enhedslisten). Currently, Socialist Youth Front often cooperates with the Red-Green Alliance, and around 80 percent of SUF members are also members of the Red-Green Alliance, though SUF itself retains an extraparliamentary focus.

Socialist Youth Front is a uniting organisation for the left-wing radical youth, and it consists of many ideological persuasions, ranging from Leninists, democratic socialists to anarchists. The politics and doctrine of SUF is, however, based on an  anti-parliamentarian,  revolutionary, and Marxist world view.

The organization publishes the external magazine Avanti, as well as the internal newsletter Blomster og Barrikader ("Flowers and Barricades").

The highest authority of the Socialist Youth Front is the national congress, which is held twice a year. Once a year, 9 members are elected to the board of leadership, which consists of 25 members, the last 16 being regional representatives who are elected locally.

External links 
 SUF website

Political youth organizations based in Denmark
Libertarian socialist organizations
2001 establishments in Denmark
Socialist parties in Denmark
Youth wings of Party of the European Left member parties
Youth wings of communist parties
Political parties established in 2001